The Camden School for Girls (CSG) is a comprehensive secondary school for girls, with a co-educational sixth form, in the London Borough of Camden in north London.  It has about one thousand students of ages eleven to eighteen, and specialist-school status as a Music College.  The school has long been associated with the advancement of women's education.

History
Founded in 1871 by the suffragist Frances Mary Buss, who also founded North London Collegiate School, the Camden School for Girls was one of the first girls' schools in England. Although not a fee-paying school by then, girls in the mid-20th century wore a traditional uniform of dark green, with blue and green striped ties. The blazer badge showed a type of ancient sailing ship called a "buss" to commemorate the founder's surname, with the motto 'Onwards and Upwards'. Although no entry exams were held, in its pre-comprehensive era, entrance was by interview.

Evacuation in the Second World War
352 girls were evacuated on Thursday 19 October 1939 to Grantham in Lincolnshire to be educated at Kesteven and Grantham Girls' School, but 450 girls were intended to have been evacuated; Margaret Thatcher, Conservative prime minister from 1979–90, was one of the girls at the Grantham school. The music teacher Grace Williams, a Welsh composer, arrived with the Camden school, and composed pieces whilst at Grantham. Zoologist Hilda Mabel Canter, of the British Phycological Society, was one of the 352 girls evacuated. Girls from Grantham were taught in the classrooms in the mornings and the Camden girls were taught in the afternoon. The Camden school moved back to Uppingham in Rutland in March 1941, having stayed in Grantham for five terms.

Grammar school
One of its most formative headmistresses, Doris Burchell, took on the school in the post war years and developed its renowned strengths in both science and music, overseeing a massive amount of new building on the site. The Sir John Cockcroft science wing was built from funds raised by many means, including a series of Celebrity Concerts held at the school and involving many eminent musicians. The school was damaged in the war but rebuilt in 1957, the architect being John Eastwick-Field OBE. In 1973 the assembly hall roof collapsed following deterioration of its roof beams due to problems with the high-alumina cement concrete used.

Comprehensive
It became comprehensive in 1976, although only year by year.  It was not fully comprehensive until 1981.

Academic performance
A 1999 Office for Standards in Education (Ofsted) report called it "a unique and very effective school in many ways."  Another, written in March 2005, said it was an "outstanding school with excellent features," and the most recent report said that it "rightly deserves the outstanding
reputation it has among parents and in the community."  Its GCSE results are excellent, and its A-level results are the best in the Camden LEA outside the private sector.

Notable former pupils

The following people were educated at the Camden School for Girls.  Some of them only attended the sixth form.
 Sally Beamish (born 1956), composer
Johnny Borrell (born 1980), musician
 Sarah Brown (born 1963), PR consultant, wife of Gordon Brown
 Sara Annie Burstall (1859–1939)
 Bessie Carter (born 1993), actress 
 Julia Cleverdon (born 1950), charity worker
 Charlotte Coleman (1968–2001), actress, Oranges Are Not the Only Fruit, expelled at age 16
 Athene Donald (born 1953), Professor of Experimental Physics at the University of Cambridge
 Julia Donaldson (born 1948), author
 Lily Donaldson (born 1987), model
 Nubya Garcia (born 1991), jazz musician
 Georgia Gould (born 1986), Labour Party politician, leader of Camden London Borough Council
 Eileen Greenwood (1915–2008) artist, printmaker, and art teacher
 Tamsin Greig (born 1967), actress
 Geri Halliwell (born 1972), singer, Spice Girls
John Hassall (born 1981), musician, The Libertines
Julia Hobsbawm (born 1964), PR, author and networking engineer
Daniel Kaluuya (born 1989), Oscar winning actor and comedian
 Kate Kellaway (born 1957), journalist for The Observer
 Lucy Kellaway (born 1959), writer and journalist for The Financial Times
 Lilian Lindsay (1871–1960), first woman with a British qualification in dentistry, having graduated from the Royal College of Surgeons of Edinburgh in 1895
 Jodhi May (born 1975), actress
 Fiona Millar (born 1958) journalist and education campaigner
 Deborah Moggach (born 1948), novelist and screenwriter
 Ellie Rowsell (born 1992) lead singer and guitarist in Wolf Alice
 Anna Shaffer (born 1992), actress
 Marianne Stone (1922–2009), actress, notably in Carry On films
 Cleo Sylvestre (born 1945) actress,  first black woman to play a lead at the National Theatre 
 E. G. R. Taylor (1871–1966), geographer and historian
 Emma Thompson (born 1959), actress
 Sophie Thompson (born 1962), actress
 Lowri Turner (born 1964), presenter & journalist
 Arabella Weir (born 1957), actress, comedian and author

Fictional pupils
 Prudence Harbinger, fictional character in The Sunday Telegraph, created by Laurence Marks and Maurice Gran

Notable former teachers
Carol Handley née Taylor - Classics teacher, Headmistress (1971-1985)
 Annie E. Ridley -  governor

Further reading
 Doris Burchell, Miss Buss' Second School, 1971.

References

External links
 EduBase

Secondary schools in the London Borough of Camden
Educational institutions established in 1871
Girls' schools in London
Voluntary aided schools in London
1871 establishments in England
Camden Town